C'mon is the eighteenth studio album by the Japanese rock duo B'z. It was released on July 27, 2011.

It debuted at the #1 spot on the Japanese Oricon music charts, and by the end of its first week of sales, the album had sold 272,000 copies. It also reached No. 1 at the Billboard Japan Top Albums.

In addition, sales of C'mon pushed the duo's total record sales to over 80 million albums and singles, a first in Japanese music history.

Two versions of C'mon were released: a CD-only version, and a limited edition version which also includes a DVD featuring promotional music video clips for "Sayonara Kizu Darake no Hibi yo," "Don't Wanna Lie," and the album's title track.

Track listing

All lyrics written by Koshi Inaba, all music composed by Tak Matsumoto alongside arrangement by Koshi Inaba, Tak Matsumoto, and Hideyuki Terachi.

Certifications

References

External links 
B'z Official Site
C'mon／Made in Japan ONLY(Album review)

2011 albums
B'z albums
Being Inc. albums
Japanese-language albums